The Confederate Memorial in Mayfield is a commemorative monument and fountain located on the courthouse lawn in downtown Mayfield, Kentucky.

Mayfield

Mayfield during the Civil War was very supportive of the Confederate States of America. Representatives from seven western Kentucky counties and twenty western Tennessee counties met at Mayfield in May 1861 to discuss forming a new state that would join the Confederacy. The secession of Tennessee on June 8, 1861 caused the proposal to be abandoned, In 1864 Union forces occupied the town and forced the townspeople to help fortify the courthouse, which was destroyed later that year. The courthouse behind the memorial fountain was built in 1889.

Description

Mayfield's United Daughters of the Confederacy obtained the fountain in 1917 from the McNeal Marble Company in Marietta, Georgia at the cost of $1,650.. The fountain, which no longer emits water, is a  obelisk with wings that double as benches. On the end of the wings are  light posts that are eight feet away from the center obelisk; the northern post is inscribed 1861, and the southern post 1865. The center obelisk has three different Confederate flags in copper relief on its top.

National Register of Historic Places
On July 17, 1997, it was one of sixty-one different monuments to the Civil War in Kentucky placed on the National Register of Historic Places, as part of the Civil War Monuments of Kentucky Multiple Property Submission.  One other monument on the list, the Confederate Memorial Gates in Mayfield, is nearby in Maplewood Cemetery, north of downtown Mayfield. Other monuments on the list that are also fountains are the Confederate Monument of Cadiz and the Confederate Memorial Fountain in Hopkinsville.

References

1920 sculptures
Civil War Monuments of Kentucky MPS
Fountains in Kentucky
National Register of Historic Places in Graves County, Kentucky
Obelisks in the United States
United Daughters of the Confederacy monuments and memorials in Kentucky
1920 establishments in Kentucky